Bank SinoPac, or SinoPac Financial Holdings Company Ltd(), is a Taiwan-based banking holding company which operates through 22 divisions as well as 125 branches in Taiwan and 3 international branches in Shanghai, Guangzhou and Chengdu (as of 2019).

History
The bank was founded by Samuel Yin and Paul Lo in 1992 as Taiwan liberalized its banking regulations. As Taiwan continued to liberalize its financial market, SinoPac acquired a securities business from the Hong family of local fame in early 2000s. In late 2005, SinoPac merged with the International Bank of Taipei(IBT). SinoPac, like many other Taiwanese financial institutions, has branches and operations in the United States and major Asian cities; however, SinoPac is unique in its foresight in building on-the-ground business in the US and China. Far East National Bank, a wholly owned California chartered bank was acquired in 1997; SinoFirst, located in Shanghai, China, was acquired in late 1990s.

In 2017, Taiwan's banking regulator, the Financial Supervisory Commission, ordered SinoPac chairman Ho Shou-chuan to step down following revelations he extended generous loans to "an offshore company with no real operations with high investment by the Yuen Foong Yu Group" which was controlled by SinoPac's founding Ho family. Ho Shou-chuan has not faced legal repercussions.

Current status
SinoPac's total assets stood at about US$40 billion. Its stock is traded on the Taiwan Stock Exchange. Bank SinoPac is a subsidiary of SinoPac Financial Holdings which has a market capitalization of around US$3.4 billion.

See also
 List of banks in Taiwan
 Economy of Taiwan
 List of companies of Taiwan

References

External links
Bank Sinopac home page

Banks of Taiwan
Banks established in 1992
Investment management companies of Taiwan
1992 establishments in Taiwan